Angel Ho is a Taiwanese actress.

Filmography

Film

References

External links
 

2007 births
21st-century Taiwanese actresses
Living people
Actresses from Taipei